The  New Orleans VooDoo season was the eighth season for the franchise in the Arena Football League. The team was coached by Pat O'Hara and played their home games at the Smoothie King Center. The VooDoo finished the season 3-15 in a three way tie to be last in the league and failed to make the playoffs for a second straight season.

Standings

Schedule
The VooDoo began the season on March 14, on the road against the Tampa Bay Storm. They hosted the San Antonio Talons on July 26 in their last regular season game.

Roster

References

New Orleans VooDoo
New Orleans VooDoo seasons
New Orleans Voodoo